James Iredell Jr. (November 2, 1788 – April 13, 1853) was the 23rd Governor of the U.S. state of North Carolina between 1827 and 1828.

Early life
Iredell was born in Chowan County, North Carolina. He was the son of well-known parents: his father, James Iredell, was a statesman and U.S. Supreme Court justice, and his mother was the sister of former Governor Samuel Johnston.  In 1806, young Iredell graduated from the College of New Jersey (today Princeton University).

On his way toward political prominence, Iredell commanded a company of volunteers during the War of 1812, practiced law in Chowan County, served in the state House of Commons, as a representative from Edenton, and was appointed a Superior Court judge.

Iredell kept a diary, which was rare among the North Carolina gentry at that time and provides researchers with a glimpse into the life of that time period.

Governor and U.S. Senator
During his short term as governor, he pushed for better infrastructure and education. Reacting to an interest of the day—horse-drawn railroad carriages—he suggested the construction of a trial railroad from Campbellton to Fayetteville.

However, his brief time in office (and the inherent weaknesses of the governor under the Constitution of North Carolina) did not allow him to accomplish much. He left office after a few months to serve in the U.S. Senate, a post he held from 1828 to 1831.  He was completing the term of Nathaniel Macon, who had resigned.  By that time, Iredell was a Jacksonian, or member of the Democratic Party.  Iredell did not seek to be re-elected by the state General Assembly to a full term in the Senate.  He moved to Raleigh, practiced law, and served as court reporter for the North Carolina Supreme Court from 1840 to 1852.  He died in Edenton and is buried there in the Johnston Burial Ground.

References

External links

Congressional Biography

1788 births
1853 deaths
American people of English descent
American people of Scottish descent
Democratic Party United States senators from North Carolina
Democratic-Republican Party state governors of the United States
Governors of North Carolina
North Carolina Democratic-Republicans
North Carolina Jacksonians
North Carolina state court judges
People from Edenton, North Carolina
Princeton University alumni
Superior court judges in the United States